The States of Gelderland are the States-Provincial for the Dutch province of Gelderland. It forms the legislative body of the province. Its 55 seats are distributed every four years in provincial elections. From 2005 till early 2019, it was chaired by Clemens Cornielje (VVD).

Current composition
Since the 2019 provincial elections, the distribution of seats of the Provincial Council of Gelderland has been as follows:

See also
 Provincial politics in the Netherlands

References

External links
  

Politics of Gelderland
Gelderland